Giannis Gerolemou (born 27 January 2000) is a Cypriot professional footballer who plays as a midfielder for Greek Super League 2 club AEK Athens B.

Career

AEL Limassol
Gerolemou made his debut for AEL Limassol in a match against Ermis.

A product of AEL Limassol academy knows as a "Thio Brephos". He made his professional debut for the first team on 10th of April 2016 at the age of 16.

AEK Athens B
On 18 August 2021, Gerolemou joined AEK Athens B on a two-year deal.

Club statistics

Honours
AEL Limassol
Cypriot Cup: 2018–19

References

External links

Player profile at uefa.com

2000 births
Living people
Cypriot footballers
Cyprus youth international footballers
Cypriot First Division players
First Professional Football League (Bulgaria) players
AEL Limassol players
FC Tsarsko Selo Sofia players
Expatriate footballers in Bulgaria
Association football midfielders
Sportspeople from Limassol
AEK Athens F.C. B players
Expatriate footballers in Greece
Cypriot expatriate sportspeople in Greece
Cypriot expatriate sportspeople in Bulgaria
Cypriot expatriate footballers